Mithat Yıldırım (born January 12, 1966) is a retired Olympian cross-country skier from Turkey.

Mithat Yıldırım competed for Turkey at the 1992 Winter Olympics and 1994 Winter Olympics in cross country 10 km (classical) and 10 km events. He was the flag bearer for his country at the 1994 Lillehammer Games.

In 2009, he was on the Technical Committee of the Turkey Ski Federation.

References

External links

1966 births
People from Muş
Olympic cross-country skiers of Turkey
Turkish male cross-country skiers
Cross-country skiers at the 1992 Winter Olympics
Cross-country skiers at the 1994 Winter Olympics
Living people